Jane Reumert (1942 – 4 April 2016) was a Danish ceramist.

Biography
Jane Louise Reumert was born in Gentofte, Denmark, and worked as a professional ceramist since the 1960s. Reumert's influences range from nature to calligraphy. She has stated that she was interested in nature and especially birds from her early youth. Those motives are found in her work of the 2000s. She used European and Asian calligraphic lettering styles.

In the late 1980s Reumert began working with porcelain and made thin salt glazed vessels, fired to 1330 °C. In the early 1990s, she experimented with adding fiberglass and other fibers to her clay, allowing thinner forms. She often displayed her work on wire tripods to create the illusion of the item floating in thin air. In 1994, Reumert was awarded the Torsten and Wanja Soderberg Nordic Design Prize. In 2011, she took part in the Nordic Woodfire Marathon, and was a guest artist at the International Ceramic Research Centre in Denmark.

Reumert had published writings and books on ceramic techniques and on her own work. She wrote in Danish and some of her books, including Transparency and Contemporary Pottery, have been translated into English.

In 2003, Jane Louise Reumert moved away from the island of Bornholm where she created some of her salt-glazed pieces with a gas-fired kiln to Copenhagen, where she used a wood-fired kiln.

Jane Louise Reumert was married first to Nils Jesper Refn, Nature Preservationist Danmarks Naturfredningsforening, and later to Danish artist Bo Bonfils.

Awards
 1968 Chr. Grauballes Mindelegat
 1977 Ole Hasslunds Kunstnerlegat
 1984 1. Price at "Internationational Exhibition of Arts and Craft" Bratislava, Tjekkoslovakiet
 1988 Ole Hasslunds Kunstnerlegat
 1994 Torsten and Wanja Söderberg Prize, Gothenburg
 1998 Prince Eugen Medal, Stockholm
 2001 Carl Jacobsen's Travel Grant, Ny Carlsbergfondet
 2003 Niels Wessel Bagge Art Grant
 2003 Thorvald Bindesbøll Medal, Copenhagen.

Gallery

References

Publications
 Transparency, Jane Reumert studio ceramist, 
 Strandstræde keramik - Værkstedsfællesskab i 40 år, Nyt Nordisk Forlag,

External links
 Reumert at Galerie Carla Koch
 Strandstræde Keramik

1942 births
2016 deaths
20th-century Danish ceramists
21st-century Danish ceramists
Danish women artisans
Danish women ceramists
People from Gentofte Municipality
Recipients of the Prince Eugen Medal